Alongkorn Jornnathong (born August 24, 1989) is a Thai professional footballer who plays as a midfielder.

References

External links
 at Soccerway

1992 births
Living people
Alongkorn Jornnathong
Alongkorn Jornnathong
Association football midfielders
Alongkorn Jornnathong
Alongkorn Jornnathong
Alongkorn Jornnathong
Alongkorn Jornnathong